The 2017–18 Liechtenstein Cup was the 73rd season of Liechtenstein's annual cup competition. Seven clubs competed with a total of 16 teams for one spot in the first qualifying round of the 2018–19 UEFA Europa League. FC Vaduz are the defending champions.

Participating clubs

TH Title holders.

First round
The first round involved all except the eight highest-placed teams. The top four teams received a bye to the third round, with the teams ranked 5th to 8th receiving a bye to the second round. FC Vaduz II (U23) did not enter the competition.

|colspan="3" style="background-color:#99CCCC; text-align:center;"|22 August 2017

|-
|colspan="3" style="background-color:#99CCCC; text-align:center;"|23 August 2017

|}

Second round
The second round involved the four winners of the first round and the four teams which received a bye through to the second round (FC Schaan, FC Balzers III, FC Triesen II and USV Eschen/Mauren III).

|colspan="3" style="background-color:#99CCCC; text-align:center;"|19 September 2017

|-
|colspan="3" style="background-color:#99CCCC; text-align:center;"|20 September 2017

|-
|colspan="3" style="background-color:#99CCCC; text-align:center;"|4 October 2017

|}

Quarterfinals
The quarterfinals involved the four teams who won in the second round, as well as the top four highest placed teams (FC Vaduz, FC Balzers, USV Eschen/Mauren  and FC Ruggell).

|colspan="3" style="background-color:#99CCCC; text-align:center;"|24 October 2017

|-
|colspan="3" style="background-color:#99CCCC; text-align:center;"|25 October 2017

|}

Semifinals

|colspan="3" style="background-color:#99CCCC; text-align:center;"|10 April 2018

|-
|colspan="3" style="background-color:#99CCCC; text-align:center;"|11 April 2018

|}

Final

References

External links
 
RSSSF

Liechtenstein Football Cup seasons
Cup
Liechtenstein Cup